Olaya Herrera is a town and municipality in the Nariño Department, Colombia. Named after the former President of Colombia Enrique Olaya Herrera. Its municipal seat is known as Bocas de Satinga.

Climate
Olaya Herrera has a tropical rainforest climate (Köppen Af) with heavy to very heavy rainfall year-round.

References

Municipalities of Nariño Department